

Results
Race 1 – Duke TT Formula One Race (6 laps – 226.38 miles)

Race 10 – Standard Bank Offshore Senior TT Race (6 laps – 226.38 miles)

External links
Isle of Man TT winners

Isle of Man TT
Isle of Man
2002
2002 in motorcycle sport